The 44th congressional district of New York was a congressional district for the United States House of Representatives in New York. It was created in 1945. It was eliminated as a result of the 1950 Census. It was last represented by John C. Butler.

List of members representing the district

Election results
The following chart shows complete election results.

References

 Congressional Biographical Directory of the United States 1774–present
 Election Statistics 1920-present Clerk of the House of Representatives

44
Former congressional districts of the United States
1945 establishments in New York (state)
1953 disestablishments in New York (state)
Constituencies established in 1945
Constituencies disestablished in 1953